The order Flavobacteriales comprises several families of environmental bacteria.

Comparative genomics and molecular signatures
Flavobacteriales is of one of the orders from the phylum Bacteroidota. Comparative genomic studies have identified several conserved indels, as well as 27 proteins that are uniquely shared by different sequenced Flavobacteriales and Bacteroidota species supporting this inference. Additionally, these studies have also identified 38 proteins that seem to be specific for the species from the order Flavobacteriales. Of these proteins, 26 were present in all sequenced species, while the remaining 12 were missing in only one or two species. These signature proteins provide potential molecular markers for this order. Several proteins have also been identified which are unique to the Flavobacteriales and Bacteroidales orders, indicating the species from these two orders shared a common ancestor exclusive of other Bacteroidota.

Phylogeny
The currently accepted taxonomy is based on the List of Prokaryotic names with Standing in Nomenclature.

Notes

See also
 List of bacterial orders
 List of bacteria genera

References

Flavobacteria